A Thousand Miles to Freedom: My Escape from North Korea (French: Corée du Nord: 9 ans pour fuir l'enfer) is a 2012 memoir by Eunsun Kim, with Sébastien Falletti. It was translated into English by David Tian in 2015.

The English-language version was first released on 21 July 2015 and was available on Amazon, at Barnes and Nobles, and many other bookstores. Immediately upon release, it was ranked #1 in several categories on Amazon, including New Releases, South Korean History, and others. 

The book was originally written in French, and subsequently translated to Norwegian and Korean. David Tian translated the book from French to English, not from Korean to English, as many media outlets have assumed. 

Eunsun Kim, whose story the memoir recounts, says that there were parts of her life that remain a little difficult to talk about, and hence she left them out of her memoir.

References

2012 non-fiction books
Books about North Korea
St. Martin's Press books